Anantavarman may refer to:

 Anantavarman (Vasishtha dynasty), 5th century Indian king
 Anantavarman Chodaganga, 12th century Indian king from the Eastern Ganga dynasty